Belonging to the Arain tribe of Punjab region, they are an aristocratic noble family. The family originally came from Areha Jericho Modern Palestine who entered in Indian Subcontinent with Umayyad Arab General Muhammad bin Qasim in the year 711 A.D. The family has made great contributions to the region and owned the land near Baghbanpura on which the Shalimar Gardens (Lahore) were built. The land was handed to the Mughal Emperor, Shah Jahan and in return custodianship of the Shalimar Gardens, Lahore was granted to the family in 1641.   

Descendants of the Baghbanpura's Mian family now live in new localities of Lahore but still own lands in the area and the historic family graveyard in Baghbanpura since early 16th century.

Notable family members
 Mian Muhammad Yusaf Manga, was noble Zamindar who was appointed custodian of the famed Shalimar Gardens, Lahore by Mughals, and also received the title of 'Mian' from Mughal emperor Shah Jahan)
 Mian Qadir Baksh, poetical name being Nadir, Chief Engineer  Artillery in Ranjit Singh's army.   
 Justice Mian Shah Din (1868–1918) – first Muslim chief judge in British India, poet and writer.
 Sir Mian Mohammad Shafi (1869–1932) – Notable muslim activist, barrister, Chief Judge, founded Punjab Muslim League, Proposed All India Muslim League, Member Viceroy's Executive Council.
 Mian Sir Muhammad Shah Nawaz – A politician of Punjab in the 1920s.
 Justice Sir Mian Abdul Rashid – first Chief Justice of Pakistan (1947).
 Mian Iftikharuddin –  Politician, owner of Pakistan Times and Daily Imroz
 Mian Muhammad Rafi – Secretary to the Government of India until Partition.
 Jahanara Shahnawaz (1896-1979) - Politician and Muslim League activist.
 Mumtaz Shahnawaz (1912-1948) - Political activist and author, who died in a plane crash at the age of 35 en-route to represent Pakistan at the UN General Assembly, the first woman in Asia to preside over a legislative session.

References

History of Punjab
History of Pakistan
Pakistani noble families
Mian family